Antonio Peñalver Asensio (born 1 December 1968 in Alhama de Murcia) is a retired Spanish decathlete. Who also was part of Larios Club, today named A.A.Moratalaz.

Achievements

External links

1968 births
Living people
Spanish decathletes
Athletes (track and field) at the 1988 Summer Olympics
Athletes (track and field) at the 1992 Summer Olympics
Athletes (track and field) at the 1996 Summer Olympics
Olympic athletes of Spain
Olympic silver medalists for Spain
Olympic silver medalists in athletics (track and field)
Medalists at the 1992 Summer Olympics